N11 or N-11 may refer to:

Roads
 N11 (South Africa)
 N11 highway, Philippines
 N11 motorway (Netherlands)
 N11 road (Ghana)
 N11 road (Ireland)
 Nebraska Highway 11, United States
 Route nationale 11, France

Other uses
 N11 (emission nebula)
 , a submarine of the Royal Navy
 Intel i860 XP, a microprocessor
 Interstitial nephritis
 LNER Class N11, a class of British steam locomotives
 London Buses route N11
 N11 code, special telephone numbers in the North American Numbering Plan
 Next eleven, a group of emerging economies proposed by Goldman Sachs
 Nieuport 11, a French World War I fighter
 Nissan Pulsar (N11), a Japanese car
 Nitrogen-11, an isotope of nitrogen
 North Springs station, a MARTA station in Sandy Springs, Georgia
 N11, a postcode district in the N postcode area of North London